Garrett Klugh (born November 18, 1974 in Los Angeles, California) is an American rower.

References 

1974 births
Living people
Sportspeople from Los Angeles
Olympic rowers of the United States
Rowers at the 2004 Summer Olympics
World Rowing Championships medalists for the United States
American male rowers